The Jerusalem Waqf and Al-Aqsa Mosque Affairs Department, also known as the Jerusalem Waqf, the Jordanian Waqf or simply the Waqf, is the Jordanian-appointed organization responsible for controlling and managing the current Islamic edifices on the Temple Mount in the Old City of Jerusalem, known to Muslims as the Al-Aqsa Mosque, which includes the Dome of the Rock. The Jerusalem Waqf is guided by a council composed of 18 members and headed by a director, all appointed by Jordan. The current director of the Waqf, since 2005, is Sheikh Azzam al-Khatib.

Name and history
In Islamic law, a waqf, plural awqaf, is an inalienable endowment – typically a building, plot of land or another property that has been dedicated for Muslim religious or charitable purposes. In Ottoman Turkish law, and later under the British Mandate of Palestine, a waqf was defined as usufruct state land (or property) from which the state revenues were assured to religious foundations. The Al-Aqsa Mosque compound in Jerusalem has been administered as a waqf since the Muslim reconquest of the Kingdom of Jerusalem in 1187. By metonymy, the foundation that administers the waqf of Jerusalem has itself come to be known as "the Waqf". 

The current version of the Jerusalem Waqf administration was instituted by the Hashemite Kingdom of Jordan after its conquest and occupation of the West Bank, including East Jerusalem, during the 1948 war. The Jerusalem Waqf remained under Jordanian control after Israel occupied the Old City of Jerusalem during the Six-Day War of June 1967, though control over access to the site passed to Israel.

Current
The Jerusalem Waqf is an organ of the Jordanian Ministry of Awqaf Islamic Affairs and Holy Places, which is charged with "implementing the Hashemite custodianship over Islamic and Christian holy sites and endowments and consolidating the historical and legal status quo."

The staff members of the Jerusalem Waqf are Jordanian-government employees. It is headed by a director, also picked by the Jordanian government. The current director of the Jerusalem Waqf is Sheikh Azzam al-Khatib, appointed in 2005. 

An agreement signed in 2013 between the State of Palestine (represented by Mahmoud Abbas) and Jordan's King Abdullah II recognized Jordan's role in managing the Jerusalem holy sites. This agreement replaced a decades-old verbal agreement.

The Jerusalem Waqf is responsible for administrative matters in the Al-Aqsa Mosque compound. Religious authority on the site, on the other hand, is the responsibility of the Grand Mufti of Jerusalem, appointed by the government of the State of Palestine.  

In 2017, Jordan enlarged the Waqf’s council from 11 members to 18. For the first time, Palestinian officials and religious leaders were installed in the body, which had historically been made up of individuals close to the Jordanian monarchy.

See also
 Custodian of the Two Holy Mosques
 Hashemite custodianship of Jerusalem holy sites
 Status Quo (Jerusalem and Bethlehem)

References

Islamic organizations based in Israel
Ministry of Endowments and Islamic Affairs (Jordan)
Temple Mount
1948 establishments in Jordan